Warren was a historic railway station located at Warren, Warren County, Pennsylvania.

The last Pennsylvania Railroad passenger train (northbound Train 581, southbound Train 580) ran March 27, 1965.

It was listed on the National Register of Historic Places in 1974 as Pennsylvania Railroad Passenger Station. It was delisted in 1986, after being demolished.

References

Former National Register of Historic Places in Pennsylvania
Railway stations on the National Register of Historic Places in Pennsylvania
Railway stations in the United States opened in 1868
Buildings and structures in Warren, Pennsylvania
Warren
1868 establishments in Pennsylvania
National Register of Historic Places in Warren County, Pennsylvania
Transportation buildings and structures in Warren County, Pennsylvania